Ashley County is a rural South Arkansas county with a culture, economy, and history based on timber and agriculture. Created as Arkansas's 52nd county on November 30, 1848, Ashley County has seven incorporated municipalities, including Hamburg, the county seat and Crossett, the most populous city. The county is also the site of numerous unincorporated communities and ghost towns. The county is named for Chester Ashley, a prominent lawyer in the Arkansas Territory and U.S. senator from the state from 1844 to 1848.

The county is roughly divided into two halves by Bayou Bartholomew, with the rich, fertile, alluvial soils of the Arkansas Delta in the east, and the shortleaf pine forests of the Arkansas Timberlands in the west. The county contains six protected areas: Overflow National Wildlife Refuge, Felsenthal National Wildlife Refuge, three Wildlife Management Areas and the Crossett Experimental Forest. Other historical features such as log cabins, one-room school houses, community centers, and museums describe the history and culture of Ashley County.

Ashley County occupies  and contained a population of 19,062 as of the 2020 Census. The economy is largely based on agriculture and small manufacturing. Poverty and unemployment rates are above national averages, but steady. Household incomes are below state and national averages. Politically, Ashley County has transitioned from reliably Democratic to steadily Republican since the mid-20th century.

Ashley County is mostly served by two school districts, Hamburg School District and Crossett School District. Higher education is provided at University of Arkansas at Monticello College of Technology—Crossett, a public two-year community college in Crossett. Ashley County Medical Center in Crossett is a community hospital providing primary care in the county. Although no Interstate highways serve Ashley County, the county has access to three United States highways (U.S. Route 82 [US 82], US 165, and US 425) and eleven Arkansas state highways. Ashley County is also served by one public owned/public use general aviation airport, Z. M. Jack Stell Field, one electric cooperative (Ashley-Chicot Electric Cooperative), and ten community water systems provide potable water to customers in the county. It is an alcohol prohibition or dry county.

History
Ashley County, the fifth-largest county in Arkansas in terms of land area, was formed by the 7th Arkansas General Assembly on November 30, 1848, from portions of Drew, Chicot and Union Counties. It was named after Chester Ashley, a US Senator and land speculator. The final borders were laid in 1861.

The first settlement in Ashley County appears to have been made by the French at Longview. Now there is no trace of Longview that was a river town connecting the Arkansas Post and Monroe, Louisiana. The Fogle and Gulett families claimed to have located at Longview in 1768 or 1770. In 1846 Captain Phillip Derden came from Virginia and moved to Longview. He bought furs and skins from hunters and trappers and ran a general store for pioneer settlers. He built a log warehouse and a lived in a 2-story log cabin. The home of Isaac Denson in Fountain Hill served as the temporary county seat until a new centrally located town could be established in 1849. It was named "Hamburg" in honor of "fine deer hams" enjoyed by the county commissioners making the selection in the vicinity. The 1850 courthouse was replaced in 1905 but was lost in a fire in 1921. The current courthouse was built in the 1960s. The courtroom in the courthouse has a one-of-a-kind architecture: it is round, and the seats are arranged so that members of the audience can always see each other.

John R. Steelman, who wrote his 1928 PhD dissertation on "mob action in the South", wrote:Ashley County has had five lynchings since 1900, the last of which occurred in 1927. On February 19, 1904 at Crossett - a sawmill town - a Negro was lynched for Murder and on September 5, another for "assaulting whites". In 1908 the only lynching in the state was at Parkdale, 
Ashley County. Earnest Williams was thrust into eternity by a band of men who were "outraged" at him for "using offensive language"'. On May 30, 1909 a Negro was lynched at Portland for Murder. The last lynching in Ashley County occurred on August 26, 1927, Winston Pounds was "taken from a posse of deputy sheriffs" and hanged to a tree one and a half miles from Wilmot, charged with having "attacked a young married woman".

Geography

Ashley County is split between two geographic regions, divided by the Bayou Bartholomew. The rich, fertile, alluvial soils of the Mississippi Alluvial Plain extend into the eastern part of the county. In Arkansas, this region is called the Arkansas Delta (in Arkansas, usually referred to as "the Delta"), having a distinct history and culture from adjacent regions. West of the Ouachita, Ashley County is characterized by forests of shortleaf pine and hardwoods typical of the Gulf Coastal Plain. In Arkansas, this region is referred to as the Arkansas Timberlands, a subdivision of the Piney Woods.

The lowest point in the state of Arkansas is located on the Ouachita River in Ashley County and Union County, where it flows out of Arkansas and into Louisiana.

Ashley County is surrounded by Drew County to the north, Chicot County to the east, Morehouse Parish, Louisiana, to the south, Union Parish, Louisiana, to the southwest, and two Timberlands counties; Union County to the west and Bradley County to the northwest.

Hydrology

Water is an extremely important part of Ashley County's geography, history, economy, and culture. The many rivers, streams, and ditches crossing the county have featured prominently since prehistoric times, and many archaeological sites, including the Lake Enterprise Mound from the Archaic period, are along waterways. Many early white settlements, including Berea, Arkansas, were founded along waterways, but many faded as railroads eclipsed waterways as the favored mode of transportation.

Ashley County is split among four watersheds: the lower Saline River in the northwest, lower Ouachita River in the southwest, Bayou Bartholomew across the majority of the county, and the Boeuf River along the eastern edge. The Saline River serves as the northwestern boundary of the county before emptying into the Ouachita River, which serves as the southwestern boundary. The Port of Crossett is positioned just south of the Saline River's mouth. Within the county, Bearhouse Creek, Chemin-a-haut Bayou, Fountain Creek, Flat Creek, Mill Creek, and Overflow Creek are important watercourses.

Protected areas
Ashley County contains Overflow National Wildlife Refuge, part of the Felsenthal National Wildlife Refuge, and four Wildlife Management Areas (WMAs) under Arkansas Game and Fish Commission jurisdiction.

Beryl Anthony Lower Ouachita WMA preserves seasonally flooded bottomland hardwood forest habitat along the Ouachita River between the Felsenthal NWR and the Louisiana state line for preservation, recreation, and hunting opportunities. Duck hunting, especially when the Ouachita River floods, is the primary hunting opportunity due to the site's position along the Mississippi Flyway, with deer and squirrel hunting also available during the year. A small segment in Ashley County contains the Coffee Prairie Natural Area, owned by the Arkansas Natural Heritage Commission.

The Casey Jones Leased Lands WMA is a common name for five fragmented parcels in Ashley and Drew counties established in 1988. The two largest segments in Ashley County are south of Crossett and in the northwest corner of the county, with a small area northwest of the Overflow WMA also included in Casey Jones WMA. This lease includes segments of working forest actively managed for forest products, primarily by single tree selection. Habitats range from upland pine to bottomland hardwood depending upon location. Deer and turkey hunting are most common in the WMA.

Little Bayou WMA is located in northeastern Ashley County along the western banks of Bayou Bartholomew at the mouth of Little Bayou. The area contains a boat ramp on Bayou Bartholomew, as well as birding, camping, fishing, and hunting. The former agricultural area was replanted with bottomland and upland hardwoods, short-leaf pines, and native warm season grasses in the 1990s.  

The Crossett Experimental Forest is a  property donated by Georgia-Pacific Corporation in 1934 to research forest management in second-growth loblolly pine and shortleaf pine forests. Within the Forest is the Reynolds Natural Area, a stand that has been largely untouched since the area's creation in 1934. The property is managed by the Southern Research Station of the United States Forest Service.

Demographics

2020 Census

As of the 2020 United States census, there were 19,062 people, 7,757 households, and 5,454 families residing in the county.

2010 Census

As of the 2010 census, there were 21,853 people, 8,765 households, and 6,227 families residing in the county. The population density was 23 people per square mile (9/km2).  There were 10,137 housing units at an average density of 11 per square mile (4/km2). The racial makeup of the county was 69.3% White, 25.8% Black or African American, 0.3% Native American, 0.5% Asian, 0.2% Pacific Islander, 3.2% from other races, and 1.1% from two or more races. 4.9% of the population were Hispanic or Latino of any race.

There were 8,765 households, out of which 33.9% had children under the age of 18 living with them, 51.5% were married couples living together, 14.9% had a female householder with no husband present, and 29.0% were non-families. 26.1% of all households were made up of individuals, and 11.8% had someone living alone who was 65 years of age or older. The average household size was 2.47 and the average family size was 2.96.

In the county, the population was spread out, with 21.4% under the age of 18, 11.0% from 18 to 24, 23.7% from 25 to 44, 27.6% from 45 to 64, and 16.2% who were 65 years of age or older. The median age was 40.3 years. For every 100 females there were 94.1 males. For every 100 females age 18 and over, there were 90.7 males.

The median income for a household in the county was $23,673, and the median income for a family was $34,934. Males had a median income of $43,594 versus $21,897 for females. The per capita income for the county was $18,779. About 14.3% of families and 18.5% of the population were below the poverty line, including 25.9% of those under age 18 and 12.5% of those age 65 or over.

2000 Census

As of the 2000 census, there were 24,209 people, 9,384 households, and 6,906 families residing in the county. The population density was 26 people per square mile (10/km2).  There were 10,615 housing units at an average density of 12 per square mile (4/km2).  The racial makeup of the county was 69.78% White, 27.10% Black or African American, 0.21% Native American, 0.18% Asian, 0.05% Pacific Islander, 1.73% from other races, and 0.96% from two or more races. 3.21% of the population were Hispanic or Latino of any race.

There were 9,384 households, out of which 33.60% had children under the age of 18 living with them, 56.80% were married couples living together, 13.00% had a female householder with no husband present, and 26.40% were non-families. 23.90% of all households were made up of individuals, and 11.20% had someone living alone who was 65 years of age or older.  The average household size was 2.55 and the average family size was 3.02.

In the county, the population was spread out, with 26.80% under the age of 18, 8.30% from 18 to 24, 27.20% from 25 to 44, 23.90% from 45 to 64, and 13.80% who were 65 years of age or older.  The median age was 36 years. For every 100 females there were 93.30 males.  For every 100 females age 18 and over, there were 90.60 males.

The median income for a household in the county was $31,758, and the median income for a family was $37,370. Males had a median income of $35,089 versus $19,501 for females. The per capita income for the county was $15,702.  About 13.90% of families and 17.50% of the population were below the poverty line, including 25.70% of those under age 18 and 17.20% of those age 65 or over.

As of 2010 Ashley County had a population of 21,853 people.  68.19% of the population were non-Hispanic whites, 25.81% were blacks, 0.32% Native Americans, 0.18% Asians and 4.89% Hispanics or Latinos.

In 2000, the largest denominational group was the Evangelical Protestants (with 16,752 adherents) and Mainline Protestants (with 1,817 adherents). The largest religious bodies were The Southern Baptist Convention (with 11,398 members) and The American Baptist Association (with 2,890 members).

Human resources

Education

Educational attainment in Ashley County is typical for a rural Arkansas county, with a 2012 study finding 84.9% of Ashley County residents over age 25 held a high school degree or higher and 13.2% holding a bachelor's degree or higher, compared to Arkansas statewide averages of 84.8% and 21.1%. Ashley County is significantly below national averages of 86.7% and 29.8%, respectively.

Primary and secondary education

Two public school districts are based in Ashley County; Hamburg School District is the largest school district in Ashley County, with the Crossett School District serving the west side of the county. Successful completion of the curriculum of these schools leads to graduation from Hamburg High School or Crossett High School, respectively. Both high schools are accredited by the Arkansas Department of Education (ADE). A small area in eastern Ashley County is served by the Lakeside School District, which is based in Lake Village.

Higher education
There are no institutions of higher education in Ashley County. The nearest public community college is Louisiana Delta Community College in Bastrop, Louisiana, followed by South Arkansas Community College in El Dorado. Nearby public four-year universities include University of Arkansas at Monticello, University of Louisiana at Monroe, and Louisiana Tech University in Ruston, Louisiana. The University of Arkansas at Monticello's College of Technology—Crossett, formerly the Forest Echoes Technology Institute, is located between North Crossett and Hamburg and offers associate degrees in general and industrial technology and technical certifications in a number of medical and technical programs.

Libraries
Ashley County has two libraries: the Ashley County Library in Hamburg and Crossett Public Library in Crossett. Both institutions offers books, e-books, media, reference, youth, business and genealogy services.

Public health
Ashley County's above-average poverty rate also indicates a high Medicaid eligibility rate. As of 2012, 35.3% of Ashley County was eligible for Medicaid, with 72.5% of children under 19 eligible for ARKids First, a program by the Arkansas Department of Human Services that combines children's Medicaid (ARKids A) and other programs for families with higher incomes (ARKids B). The county's population is significantly above healthy weight, with 71.9% of adults and 39.8% of children/adolescents ranking as overweight or obese, above the state averages of 67.1% and 39.3%, themselves significantly above national averages of 62.9% and 30.3%, respectively.

The Ashley County Medical Center in Crossett is the nearest medical center offering acute inpatient care, emergency care, diagnostics, general surgery, orthopedic surgery, OB/GYN, rehabilitation, therapy, and senior care services. The facility is rated as a Level 4 Trauma Center by the Arkansas Department of Health.

The nearest Level 1 Trauma Centers are Arkansas Children's Hospital and University of Arkansas for Medical Sciences, both in Little Rock.

Public safety
The Ashley County Sheriff's Office is the primary law enforcement agency in the county. The agency is led by the Ashley County Sheriff, an official elected by countywide vote every four years. Police departments in Crossett, Hamburg, Portland and Wilmot provide law enforcement in their respective jurisdictions, with remaining municipalities contracting with the Ashley County Sheriff's Office for law enforcement services.

The county is under the jurisdiction of the Ashley County District Court, a local district court. Local district courts in Arkansas are courts of original jurisdiction for criminal, civil, small claims, and traffic matters. Local district courts are presided over by an elected part-time judge who may privately practice law. The district court has two departments, Crossett and Hamburg.

Superseding district court jurisdiction is the 10th Judicial Circuit Court, which covers Ashley, Bradley, Chicot, Desha, Drew counties. The 10th Circuit contains three circuit judges, elected to six-year terms circuitwide.

The seven incorporated municipalities and two census-designated places each provide fire protection, in some cases extending beyond corporate limits. Rural areas are served by the Berlin Volunteer Fire Department, Milo Fire Department, or Unity Frost Prairie Fire Department. All fire departments in Ashley County are volunteer-based, except the Crossett Fire Department.

Culture and contemporary life

Ashley County has several facilities, monuments, and museums dedicated to preserving the history and culture of the area. The Ashley County Museum, owned and operated by the Ashley County Historical Society, preserves and interprets the history and culture of Ashley County for visitors. Four properties related to the history of forestry are listed on the National Register of Historic Places, including the Crossroads Fire Tower, installed by the Civilian Conservation Corps in 1935. The Old Company House Museum in Crossett City Park is one of the original mill houses constructed by the Crossett Lumber Company prior to 1910. The house contains period decorations and offers tours by appointment. Other cultural points of interest in Ashley County include:

Six churches listed on the NRHP in Ashley County maintain the history and culture of evangelical Protestantism in the area
The Ashley County Farmer's Market is an informal market (no set times).
The Hamburg Garden Club has been located in a historic church at the corner of Cherry and Lincoln Streets since 1987.
Over 75 species are contained at the Crossland Zoo in Crossett.

Annual cultural events
Hamburg hosts the World Famous Armadillo Festival annually during the first weekend in May. The Ashley County Fair is hosted during the first weekend in September at the Ashley County Fairgrounds in Hamburg, and includes a rodeo and the Miss Ashley County pageant in the Maxwell Hill Auditorium. Crossett hosts the Crossett Professional Rodeo Cowboys Association Rodeo in August and the Wiggins Cabin Arts & Crafts Festival each October.

Media
The Ashley County Ledger of Hamburg and the Ashley News Observer of Crossett are the county's two weekly newspapers.

Ashley County is within the Monroe, Louisiana-El Dorado designated market area with the following local TV stations: KNOE (dual ABC/CBS and The CW), KARD (Fox), KTVE (NBC), and two PBS affiliates: KLTM-TV (Louisiana) and KETZ (Arkansas).

The county is home to two FM radio stations: KAGH-FM (104.9 FM, "Today's Country 104.9") and KWLT (102.7 FM). and KAGH (800 AM, "Oldies Radio 800").

The county has a local weather blog called South Ark Weather & News and an online daily news website called South Ark Daily.

Government and politics

The county government is a constitutional body granted specific powers by the Constitution of Arkansas and the Arkansas Code. The quorum court is the legislative branch of the county government and controls all spending and revenue collection. Representatives are called justices of the peace and are elected from county districts every even-numbered year. The number of districts in a county vary from nine to fifteen based on population, and district boundaries are drawn by the Ashley County Election Commission. The Ashley County Quorum Court has eleven members. Presiding over quorum court meetings is the county judge, who serves as the chief operating officer of the county. The county judge is elected at-large and does not vote in quorum court business, although capable of vetoing quorum court decisions.

Since the mid-20th century, Ashley County has transitioned from reliably Democratic to steady Republican in national, state and local elections. Ashley County was part of the Solid South, a period of Democratic hegemony which began after Reconstruction following the Civil War. This resulted essentially in a one-party system, in which a candidate's victory in Democratic primary elections was tantamount to election to the office itself. The Solid South started to dissolve following the Civil Rights Act in 1964, which is when Ashley County's streak of supporting Democratic candidates ended. Republican presidential candidate support continued to grow after 1964, though Ashley County strongly supported fellow Southerners in Presidential elections: Alabama Governor George Wallace in 1968, Georgia Governor Jimmy Carter in 1976, fellow Arkansan Bill Clinton in 1992 and 1996, and Al Gore in 2000. By the 2004 election, the county narrowly supported George W. Bush, but subsequently supported Barack Obama's opponents and Donald Trump by 2/1 margins.

Political Culture

In Congress, Arkansas has been represented by two Republican senators, John Boozman and Tom Cotton, since January 3, 2015, ending a long history of Democratic hegemony. In the House of Representatives, Ashley County is the easternmost county within the 4th congressional district, which contains Southwest Arkansas, the Arkansas River Valley, and a few Ozark counties. The 4th has been represented by Bruce Westerman since 2014.

In the Arkansas Senate, Ashley County is within the 26th District. The district contains much of Southeast Arkansas and has been represented by Eddie Cheatham (D) since 2013. In the Arkansas House of Representatives, Ashley County is split among three districts. The rural northwestern part of the county is within the 8th District, a long and narrow district stretching northwest to Arkadelphia. The 8th District has been represented by Jeff Wardlaw (R) since 2011. Crossett and Hamburg are within the 9th District, which also spans much of Drew County. The 9th District has been represented by LeAnne Burch (D) since 2019. The remainder of Ashley County is within the 11th District, which also contains Chicot and Desha counties. The 11th District has been represented by Don Glover (D) since 2019.

Taxation

Property tax is assessed by the Ashley County Assessor annually based upon the fair market value of the property and determining which tax rate, commonly called a millage in Arkansas, will apply. The rate depends upon the property's location with respect to city limits, school district, and special tax increment financing (TIF) districts. This tax is collected by the Ashley County Collector between the first business day of March of each year through October 15th without penalty. The Ashley County Treasurer disburses tax revenues to various government agencies, such as cities, county road departments, fire departments, libraries, and police departments in accordance with the budget set by the quorum court.

Sales and use taxes in Arkansas are voter approved and collected by the Arkansas Department of Finance and Administration.
Arkansas's statewide sales and use tax has been 6.5% since July 1, 2013. Ashley County has an additional sales and use tax of 1.50% since July 1, 2010. Within Ashley County, the City of Crossett has an additional 2.25% sales and use tax since January 1, 2014, and Fountain Hill, Hamburg, Portland, and Wilmot have a 1.00% sales and use tax rate. The Arkansas State Treasurer disburses tax revenue to counties/cities in accordance with tax rules.

Communities

Six incorporated cities and one town are located within the county. The largest city is Crossett, located in the southwest part of the county near the Ouachita River. Crossett's population in 2010 was 5,507, but including the two adjacent unincorporated census designated places of North Crossett and West Crossett, the total population was 10,752 in 2010. The county seat, Hamburg, is centrally located in the county and had a population of 2,857 at the 2010 Census. The four remaining cities are all located along US 165 in the eastern part of the county, and have populations below 1,000 people: Montrose,  Parkdale, Portland, and Wilmot. The lone incorporated town, Fountain Hill, is located north of Hamburg and had a population of 175 in 2010.

Ashley County has dozens of unincorporated communities and ghost towns within its borders. This is due to early settlers in Arkansas tending to settle in small clusters rather than incorporated towns, especially along bayous or river landings in Ashley County. For example, communities like Longview and Milo had a post office or other buildings at some point in their history. Other communities are simply a few dwellings at a crossroads that have adopted a common place name over time. Some are officially listed as populated places by the United States Geological Survey, and others are listed as historic settlements.

Cities
 Crossett (Largest City)
 Hamburg (County Seat)
 Montrose
 Wilmot

Towns
 Fountain Hill
 Parkdale
 Portland

Census Designated Places
 North Crosset
 West Crosset

Unincorporated communities

 Beech Creek Crossing
 Berea
 Berlin
 Bovine
 Boydell
 Cremer
 Crossroad
 Donbey
 Forest Park Addition
 Gulledge
 Kimball
 Lloyd
 Longview Crossing
 Martinville
 Meridian
 Miller's Chapel
 Milo
 Mist
 Moore's Mill
 Mount Olive
 Mount Pleasant
 Oakhurst Addition
 Old Milo
 Post Oak
 Promised Land
 Pugh
 Rawls
 Riley
 Roark
 Rolfe Junction
 Snyder
 South Crossett
 Stillions
 Sulphur Springs
 Sunshine
 Thebes
 Trafalgar
 Unity
 Venice
 Wallace
 White
 Whitlow
 Whitlow Junction
 Petersburg

Historical communities

 Brushy
 Elon
 Jackson
 Matoka
 Phelan

Townships

 Banner
 Bayou
 Bearhouse
 Beech Creek
 Carter (contains Hamburg)
 De Bastrop (contains Parkdale)
 Egypt (contains Crossett, West Crossett, and most of North Crossett)
 Elon
 Extra
 Longview
 Marais Saline
 Mill Creek (contains part of North Crossett)
 Montrose (contains Montrose)
 Portland (contains Portland)
 Prairie
 Union
 White (contains Fountain Hill)
 Wilmot (contains Wilmot)

Source:

Infrastructure

Aviation
The county contains one public owned/public use airport: Z. M. Jack Stell Field, a small, rural airport east of Crossett with over 16,000 annual operations, almost entirely agricultural spraying operations. Ashley County also contains five private airfields in the eastern part of the county.

Major highways

Ashley County is not served by any Interstate highways; the nearest access to the Interstate system is Interstate 20 (I-20) in Monroe, Louisiana. The county serves as a junction point for several US highways: US Highway 82 (US 82) crosses the county from west to east. This highway runs across South Arkansas, providing access to population centers including El Dorado, Magnolia, and Texarkana. The highway also has two special routes in Ashley County: a spur route to Felsenthal National Wildlife Refuge and business route in Montrose. US 165 and US 425 cross the county from south to north, both run south into Louisiana, with the former running north through the Arkansas Delta to North Little Rock and the latter providing northbound connections to Monticello and Pine Bluff.

Eleven state highway designations serve the traveling public in the county, ranging from short connector routes to long highways traversing the entire county. Highway 8 east-west across the southern part of the state, entering Ashley County from Warren, passing through from northwest to southeast through Hamburg, and exiting Ashley County running east to Eudora. Highway 133 serves north–south traffic around Crossett. Highway 144, two segments of Highway 160, and three segments of Highway 52 provide east–west connectivity. Highway 169 and Highway 189 connect rural areas to Crossett and Hamburg, respectively. Highway 173 connects Overflow NWR to the state highway system. Highway 209 is a minor route in Parkdale.

Utilities

The Ashley-Chicot Electric Cooperative, based in Hamburg, is a non-profit electric utility cooperative serving the rural areas of Ashley County with electric service, as well as parts of adjacent counties. Entergy Arkansas provides electricity for the cities of Hamburg and Crossett and nearby populated outlying areas, and to the small communities along US 165.

The Arkansas Department of Health (ADH) is responsible for the regulation and oversight of public water systems throughout the state. Ten community water systems are based in Ashley County: the Crossett Water Commission, Fountain Hill Waterworks, Hamburg Waterworks, Montrose/Boydell Water System, North Crossett Utilities, Northeast Crossett Water Association, Parkdale Waterworks, Portland Waterworks, Wilmot Waterworks, and the West Ashley County Water Association. All use groundwater as the source. The Crossett Water Commission has the largest direct retail population served (8,038, all in Ashley County), followed by Hamburg (5,481), and North Crossett Utilities (2,924). The remaining water systems have under 1,000 retail population served.

See also
 List of lakes in Ashley County, Arkansas
 National Register of Historic Places listings in Ashley County, Arkansas
List of counties in Arkansas

Notes

References

External links
 Ashley News Observer
 Ashley County Official Website

 
1848 establishments in Arkansas
Populated places established in 1848